Hanadi is a town in northwestern Syria, administratively part of the Latakia Governorate, located south of Latakia. Nearby localities include Baksa and Sqoubin to the north, al-Bassah to the west and Fideo to the east. According to the Syria Central Bureau of Statistics, Hanadi had a population of 3,076 as of the 2004 census. Its inhabitants are predominantly Alawites.

References

Populated places in Latakia District
Towns in Syria
Alawite communities in Syria